Pietro Uberti (1671-1762) was an Italian painter, active in Venice, and painting portraits. He was son of Domenico, a mediocre painter. He was a contemporary of Nicolo Grassi. He painted a series of lawyers for the Ducal Palace, Venice.

References

1671 births
1762 deaths
17th-century Italian painters
Italian male painters
18th-century Italian painters
Italian Baroque painters
Painters from Venice
18th-century Italian male artists